is a puzzle-platform game starring NTT DoCoMo's mascot, Docomodake. Their rival is NHK's mascot, Domo-Kun who has been in games of his own. It was developed by Suzak and AQ Interactive.

External links 

IGN review (archive)
Boing! Docomodake DS at GameFAQs

2007 video games
Advergames
AQ Interactive games
Multiplayer and single-player video games
Nintendo DS games
Nintendo DS-only games
NTT Docomo
Puzzle-platform games
Video games developed in Japan
UTV Ignition Games games
Suzak Inc. games